The Hunter 44, also called the Hunter 44 DS (Deck Salon), is an American sailboat, that was designed by Glenn Henderson  and first built in 2003.

Production
The boat was built by Hunter Marine in the United States from 2003 to 2008, but it is now out of production. A total of 151 examples were completed during its five-year production run.

Design

The Hunter 44 is a development of the 2002-introduced Hunter 426 DS, with a redesigned aft cabin. The Hunter 44 design was developed into the Hunter 45 DS in 2008 with the addition of twin helms, redesigned forward berth and new cabin windows.

The Hunter 44 shares the same hull design as the Hunter 426 DS, Hunter 45 DS, Hunter 44 AC (aft-cockpit) and the Hunter 45 CC (center cockpit).

The 44 is a small recreational keelboat, built predominantly of fiberglass, without any external wood trim. It has a fractional sloop B&R rig, an internally-mounted spade-type rudder and a fixed fin keel. With the longer keel it displaces  and carries  of ballast.

See also
List of sailing boat types

Similar sailboats
C&C 44
Corbin 39
Gulfstar 43
Nordic 44

References

External links

Keelboats
2000s sailboat type designs
Sailing yachts
Sailboat type designs by Glenn Henderson
Sailboat types built by Hunter Marine